Um Menino Muito Maluquinho was a Brazilian children's show, produced and aired by TVE Brasil and was originally broadcast from 19 March to 10 July 2006. The series was based on book of the same name by Brazilian cartoonist Ziraldo, with 26 episodes and one season. It was directed by César Rodrigues. Cao Hamburger and Anna Muylaert wrote the screenplay. Muyalert is also author of some of the character's books.

The series focuses on the adventures of the fictional protagonist, Maluquinho, and his friends at 5 and 10 years of age, which covers topics about art, time, friendship, school and other aspects of life, usually narrated by a 30-year old Maluquinho. The series received positive reviews from television critics, earned high ratings, and has won some awards, such as Japan's NHK Japan Prize award. It was also nominated for an International Emmy Award for Best Children and Youth program in 2007.

Plot 
The story follows two timelines: Maluquinho's life at 5 and 10 years, while being narrated by his 30-year old version. They teach important lessons about art, consumerism, value of money, time, friendship, school and other aspects of life.

Sometimes, the characters give their opinion about a current event or foreshadow some event that will eventually take place in the episode, speaking to the cameras, in front of a white wall.

Episodes

Cast 
Cast of 5-year old Maluquinho's story
 Felipe Severo as Menino Maluquinho
 Rafael Ritto as Bocão
 Myla Christie Bonifácio as Julieta
 Luiz Eduardo Dias as Junim
 Alexandro Domingos as Lúcio
 Eduardo Akira as Sugiro
 Eduardo Aiella as Herman
 Thiago Marcelo Magalhães as Pedroca

Cast of 10-tear old Maluquinho's story
 Pedro Saback as Menino Maluquinho
 Cristian Zucolotto as Bocão
 Sarah Maciel as Julieta
 Júlia Mattos as Bianca
 Gabriel Sequeira as Junim
 Andrey Emerich as Lúcio
 Felipe Santos as Fred
 Leonam Akira as Sugiro
 Vinícius Kubrusly as Herman
 Maria Clara Mendonça as Carolina
 Karolina Afonso as Pagu
 Rayane Menezes as Vera
 Fellipe Thuler as Pedroca
 Rita de Cássia de Oliveira as Renata'
 Mariana Azevedo as Mariana''

Adult cast
 Fernando Alves Pinto as 30-year old Menino Maluquinho
 Maria Mariana as Ana (Maluquinho's mother)
 Eduardo Galvão as Pedro (Maluquinho's father)
 Antônio Pedro as Seu Hortêncio (Maluquinho's grandfather)
 Ilva Niño as Irene (maid)
 Clarice Niskier as Paula (Teacher)
 Ellen Rocche as Fairy Godmother
 Luiz Nicolau as Baiaco

Production 
Filming lasted six months and were done in a studio of 600 square meters, which had a full floor, with Maluquinho's room, his parents' room, a living room, a kitchen and a bathroom. Most of the furniture the art direction decided to use was old in order to convey the reality of a house.

Broadcast 
The series premiered on March 19, 2006 on TVE Brasil with new episodes every Sunday at 6:30 p.m. It was moved to Fridays at 11:30 a.m. and 2 p.m., and on Saturdays at 10 a.m. On July 2, 2006, TVE Brasil broadcast a binge-watch of ten episodes from 9h to 14h. Another novelty was the change in the broadcast schedule, with new episodes airing from June 26, 2006 from Monday to Friday at 8 p.m.

On 24 March 2006, the series premiered on TV Cultura with new episodes every Fridays at 2 p.m (later with reruns on Thursdays at 10 a.m.). The program stopped airing on TV Cultura on January 25, 2008.

On December 4, 2006, the series premiered on Disney Channel from Monday to Friday at 12 p.m. It was broadcast on TV Brasil from September 26, 2011 to January 20, 2013.

The series aired on TV Escola from April 1, 2013 on Saturdays and Sundays. The program is no longer broadcast as of December 1, 2014, due to the new programming schedule of the network.

Awards and nominations

References

External links 
 

Brazilian children's television series
2006 Brazilian television series debuts
2006 Brazilian television series endings
Television shows based on books
Portuguese-language television shows